The 2012 Oman Super Cup was the tenth edition of the Oman Super Cup, an annual soccer match between the previous season's champions of the Oman Professional League and the champions of the Sultan Qaboos Cup. In 2012, Fanja SC, the champion of the 2011-12 Oman Professional League, played Dhofar S.C.S.C., the champion of the 2011 Sultan Qaboos Cup. The match was played at the Royal Oman Police Stadium in Muscat, Oman, on 29 August 2012, with Fanja winning 1-0.

Match details

References

External links
2013 Oman Super Cup - Soccerway
2012 Oman Super Cup - Goalzz.com
2012 Oman Super Cup - YouTube

Oman Super Cup seasons
Cup
Oman